The name Raimundo may refer to:

 Raimundo, 2nd Duke of Castel Duino (1907–1986)
 Raimundo Calcagno, Spanish screenwriter
 Raimundo Rolón, brief President of Paraguay
 Raimundo Orsi, Argentinian footballer
 Raimundo Diosdado Caballero, Catholic miscellaneous writer
 Raimundo Andueza Palacio, former President of Venezuela
 Raimundo de Ovies, American religious leader, author, columnist, and humanitarian
 Raimundo Fernández Villaverde, Spanish statesman
 Raimundo Pérez Lezama, Spanish/Basque footballer
 Raimundo de Madrazo y Garreta, Spanish realist painter
 Ueslei Raimundo Pereira da Silva, Brazilian footballer
 Raimundo Lulio, writer and philosopher
 Oscar Raimundo Benavides, former President of Peru
 Raimundo of Toledo, French Archbishop of Toledo
 Raimundo Ferreira Ramos, Brazilian footballer
 Raymond of Penyafort, Spanish Dominican friar
 Raimundo Santiago, actor
 Raimundo Yant, Venezuelan boxer
 José Raimundo Carrillo, early Spanish settler
 Wilson Raimundo Júnior, Brazilian footballer
 José Raimundo Martínez, founder of the ETB (company)
 Raimundo Justin Alexander III, Portuguese Largest Landowner Portugal
 Raimundo António Rodrigues Serrão, Portuguese colonial governor of Portuguese Guinea
 Raimundo Fajardo, drummer of El Otro Yo
 Raimundo Camacho, Bolivian wrestler at the 1984 Summer Olympics

In fiction
 Raimundo Pedrosa, character in American animated television series Xiaolin Showdown (2003–2006)

Places
 San Raimundo, municipality in the Guatemala department of Guatemala

See also
Raimundos, a Brazilian band